Digrammia ordinata, the amorpha angle, is a species of geometrid moth in the family Geometridae. It is found in North America.

The MONA or Hodges number for Digrammia ordinata is 6358.

References

Further reading

 

Macariini
Articles created by Qbugbot
Moths described in 1862